Hywel Gwynfryn (born 13 July 1942 at Llangefni, Anglesey) is a Welsh TV, and radio personality and lyricist. He started working for the BBC in 1964 and joined Radio Cymru at its inception.

Career
Gwynfryn joined the BBC as a presenter in 1964 and in October 1968, he fronted Helo Sut Dach Chi?, the first dedicated Welsh language pop programme on the radio. It was a daring innovation because there was little vocal pop music in Welsh at the time and the show sometimes needed to be padded out with Anglo-American instrumentals. Soon however, Gwynfryn was receiving demo tapes from across Wales, and introduced a "patter" of Welsh language pop slang in the show which appealed to younger listeners. In 1970 he joined Children's Programming and worked on documentaries from different parts of the world.

He has been with the Welsh-language radio station Radio Cymru since its inception in 1977, fronting the flagship morning programme, and presenting shows such as Hywel a Nia and Helo Bobol, and reporting annually from the Eisteddfod. Alongside his radio career, Gwynfryn has also presented TV shows such as Heddiw and Rhaglen Hywel Gwynfryn, and in 1972, with Huw Ceredig, started a weekly Welsh disco called Noson Barbarella in Cardiff. In 1990 he fronted On your bike, a TV programme, following the fortunes of Welsh families who had gone to live in other countries.

Gwynfryn has also written four pantomimes, including Jiw Jiw Jeifin Jenkins, as well as writing a film for the Welsh-language TV station S4C.

Personal life
Gwynfryn was born in Llangefni, Anglesey. He was educated at Ysgol Gyfun Llangefni and the Royal Welsh College of Music & Drama. Gwynfryn and his wife Anja had five children, one of whom is musician and broadcaster H. Hawkline; Anja died on 6 October 2018 from cancer. He also has two children from his first marriage.  As a student he was a roommate of Lynn Davies.

References

External links
BBC Radio Cymru - Hywel Gwynfryn

1942 births
Welsh radio presenters
Welsh-language television presenters
Welsh television presenters
Living people
People from Anglesey
Alumni of the Royal Welsh College of Music & Drama
People educated at Ysgol Gyfun Llangefni